Kaus is a German language surname. Such as the related Kauss it either belongs to the group of family names derived from a given names – in this case from several compound names of Germanic origin with the element gōʐ "Goth" (e. g. Goswin, Gosbert, Gosbald or Gauzbert) – or may be a variant of the habitational name Kues (from Late Latin covis "field barn", "rack"). Notable people with the name include:
 Bill Kaus (1923–2006), Australian politician
 Gina Kaus (1893–1985), Austrian-American novelist and screenwriter
 Jan Kaus (born 1971), Estonian writer
 Max Kaus (1891–1977), German expressionist painter
 Mickey Kaus (born 1951), American journalist, pundit and author
 Otto Kaus (1920–1996), American lawyer and judge
 Stephen Kaus (born 1948), American journalist

References 

German-language surnames
Estonian-language surnames